This list of old waterbodies of the Rhine contains a selection of ox-bow lakes and meanders of the River Rhine which go under various names that mean Old Rhine or Old Arm [of the Rhine]: Alter Rhein, Altrhein, Altrheinarm, Altrheinzug, Altarm, Rheinaltarm or Restrhein. Artificially created waterbodies, such as quarry ponds; e. g. the Altrheinsee, which may be confused with old branches of the Rhine are mentioned in the section Waterbodies linked to the Rhine.

As a result of natural translocation, the ox-bows and meanders of the Rhine riverbed remain as side arms of the New Rhine (Neurhein); others were cut off as a result of artificial river canalisation, such as in the wake of the canalisation of the Rhine (Rheinbegradigung) from 1817 under the direction of Johann Gottfried Tulla. These old waters, together with the New Rhine, circumscribe islands or peninsulas. The old river courses have mostly lost their water-bearing link to the New Rhine. Many lie within nature reserves, offer breeding sites for water birds or act as washlands during flooding. Sometimes they are used by canoeists or anglers.

 Old Rhine waterbodies Locating old Rhine waterbodies in the list:Some names of old Rhine waterbodies include the name of a nearby town or village; others do not. In order to make it easy to find in every case, the nearby settlement is usually written in alphabetical order and italics before each waterbody name as a means of locating it. Next, the coordinates of the waterbody and its position on the Rhine (l/r =  left/right) follow, then comes either the waterbody name itself in normal lettering, as well as other names of the waterbody in italics. Or there may just be a reference to the name of another place name behind the town name, under which the river is listed in italics.

 Altarm 
see also (below) → Rheinaltarm
 near Bad Honnef:Altarm (Bad Honnef) (r), between Bad Honnef and the Rhine island of Grafenwerth, Rhein-Sieg-Kreis, North Rhine-Westphalia
 near Auenheim:near Auenheim, Ortenaukreis, Baden-Württemberg:
 Altarm (Auenheim) (r)
 Altarm Sportplatz (r)

 Alter Rhein 
in the canton of St. Gallen (Switzerland) and in the state of Vorarlberg (Austria) – old arms of the Alpine Rhine:
 Alter Rhein (Diepoldsauer Durchstich) (r), near Diepoldsau and Hohenems; formed by the Diepoldsauer Durchstich
 Alter Rhein (Fußacher Durchstich) (r), near St. Margrethen, Höchst, Rheineck, Gaißau and Altenrhein; formed by the Fußacher Durchstich
in Germany:
 near Rheinberg;see below → near Rheinberg
 near Xanten;see below → near Xanten

 Altrhein 
numerous old Rhine waterbodies:
 near Altlußheim;see below → near Speyer
 near Altrip;see below → near Neuhofen
 near Astheim;see below → near Ginsheim
 bei Au am Rhein:Auer Altrhein (r), near Au am Rhein, county of Rastatt, Baden-Württemberg;see also (below) → near Auer old arms of the Rhine
 near Baumberg;see below → near Urdenbach
 near Berghausen:Berghäuser Altrhein (l), near Berghausen, Rhein-Pfalz-Kreis, Rhineland-Palatinate
 near Bienen;see below → near Rees
 near Birten;see below → near Xanten
 near Breisach:see below → Altrhein or Restrhein
 near Daxlanden;see below → near Karlsruhe
 near Dornick;see below → near Rees
 near Eggenstein-Leopoldshafen:near Eggenstein-Leopoldshafen, county of Karlsruhe, Baden-Württemberg:
 Altrhein (Eggenstein-Leopoldshafen) (r), near Eggenstein and Leopoldshafen
 Altrhein (Eggenstein) (r), near Eggenstein
 Eggensteiner Altrhein (r), Rheinniederung Canal, near Eggenstein and Leopoldshafen
 near Eich;see below → Eicher See and below → near Gimbsheim
 bei Elchesheim-Illingen:near Elchesheim-Illingen, county of Rastatt, Baden-Württemberg:
 Altrhein (Elchesheim) (r), near Elchesheim
 Illinger Altrhein (r), near Illingen;see also (below) → near Steinmauern
 near Emmerich am Rhein;see below → near Rees
 near Erfelden;see below → near Stockstadt/Erfelden
 near Esserden;see below → near Rees
 near Flüren:Flürener Altrhein (r), near Flüren (Wesel), Kreis Wesel, North Rhine-Westphalia
 bei Gimbsheim:Gimbsheimer Altrhein (Eich-Gimbsheimer Altrhein) (l), between Eich and Gimbsheim, county of Alzey-Worms, Rhineland-Palatinatesee also (below) → Altrheinsee and (below) → Eicher See
 bei Ginsheim:Ginsheimer Altrhein (r), near Ginsheim-Gustavsburg and near Astheim (Trebur), Kreis Groß-Gerau, Hessen
 near Giriz;see below → near Giriz (Rheinaltarm)
 bei Grauelsbaum:nahe Grauelsbaum (Lichtenau), county of Rastatt, Baden-Württemberg (looking down the Rhine):see also (below) → near Greffern
 Altrheinarm Kirchhöfel (r)
 Altrheinzug (Grauelsbaum) (r)
 near Gernsheim;see below → near Groß-Rohrheim
 bei Greffern:nahe Greffern (Rheinmünster), county of Rastatt, Baden-Württemberg (looking down the Rhine):see also (above) → near Grauelsbaum
 Altrhein 1 (Greffern) (Entenloch) (r)
 Altrhein 2 (Greffern) (r)
 near Griethausen;see below → near Kleve
 near Groß-Rohrheim:Hammerauer Altrhein (r), in the reserve of Hammer Aue von Gernsheim und Groß-Rohrheim, near Groß-Rohrheim and Gernsheim, Bergstraße, Hesse
  near Hagenbach:near/nahe Hagenbach, county of Germersheim, Rhineland-Palatinate:
 Hagenbacher Altrhein (l), near Hagenbach
 Insel Nauas Altrhein (l), near Hagenbach
 near Heidesheim:Altrhein Haderaue (l), near Heidesheim am Rhein, county of Mainz-Bingen, Rhineland-Palatinate
 near Hamm am Rhein;see above → near Gimbsheim
 near Hofheim;see below → near Lampertheim
 bei Honau;see below → near Diersheim: Steinwert-Hot 2 (Altrheinarm)
 bei Hügelsheim:near Hügelsheim, county of Rastatt, Baden-Württemberg:
 Altrhein (Hügelsheim) (r)
 Altrheinzug (Hügelsheim) (r)
 near Ilverich:Ilvericher Altrheinschlinge (l), near Meerbusch, Strümp and Ilverich, Rhein-Kreis Neuss, North Rhine-Westphalia
 near Jockgrim:near Jockgrim, county of Germersheim, Rhineland-Palatinate;see also (below) → near Wörth am Rhein
 Altrhein südlich Jockgrim (l), an and teils auf Grenze zu Wörth am Rhein
 Altrhein Hörnel (Hörnel-Altrhein) (l),by the Rhine island of Hörnel, aber in the Gebiet from Wörth am Rhein
 bei Karlsruhe:im Gebiet the kreisfreien Stadt Karlsruhe, Baden-Württemberg (looking down the Rhine):see also (below) → Knielinger See
 Rappenwörter Altrhein (r), near Karlsruhe-Daxlanden
 Altrhein Kleiner Bodensee (r), in the NSG Altrhein Kleiner Bodensee, near Neureut, nearm Ölhäfen
 near Knielingen;see below → Knielinger See
 near Kellen;see below → near Kleve
 near Ketsch:Ketscher Altrhein (r), near Ketsch, Rhein-Neckar-Kreis, Baden-Württemberg
 near Kleve:near Kleve, Kleve, North Rhine-Westphalia:
 Kellener Altrhein (l), near Kellen
 Griethauser Altrhein (l), near Griethausen
 near Klein-Rohrheim;see above → near Groß-Rohrheim
 bei Lampertheim: near Lampertheim, Kreis Bergstraße, Hessen:
 Lampertheimer Altrhein (r), in the NSG Lampertheimer Altrhein, near Lampertheim and Biblis
 Maulbeerauer Altrhein (Hofheimer Altrhein, Nordheimer Altrhein) (r), near the Rhine island of Maulbeeraue, near Hofheim (Lampertheim) and Hofheim (Biblis)
 bei Leimersheim: near Leimersheim and Neupotz, county of Germersheim, Rhineland-Palatinate (looking down the Rhine):
 Altrhein near Neupotz (l)
 Altrhein Leimersheim (l)
 near Lingenfeld:Lingenfelder Altrhein (l), near Lingenfeld, county of Germersheim, Rhineland-Palatinate
 near Linkenheim-Hochstetten:Altrhein Insel Rott (r), by the island of Rott, near Linkenheim-Hochstetten, Karlsruhe, Baden-Württemberg
 near Ludwigshafen am Rhein;see below → near Roxheim
 near Mannheim:im Gebiet the kreisfreien Stadt Mannheim, Baden-Württemberg:
 Altrhein Backofen (r), near Rheinauhafen
 Mannheimer Altrhein (Waldhofer / Sandhofer Altrhein) (r), with Mannheimer Altrheinhafen and Industriehafen, near the Friesenheimer Insel and den Stadtteilen Waldhof and Sandhofen sowie in the Stadtbezirk and Stadtteil Neckarstadt-West
 Altrhein Sandhofen-Ballauf (r), near Sandhofen
 near Märkt:Altrhein Märkt (r; with Krebsbach), near Märkt (Weil am Rhein), Lörrach, Baden-Württemberg;see also (below) → Altrhein or Restrhein
 near Marlen:near Marlen (Kehl), Ortenaukreis, Baden-Württemberg:
 Altrhein Fischerkopf (r)
 Altrhein Saurheinkopf (r)
 near Maxau;see below → Knielinger See
 near Maximiliansau;see above → near Hagenbach and below → near Wörth am Rhein
 near Mechtersheim:Mechtersheimer Altrhein (l), near Mechtersheim (Römerberg), Rhein-Pfalz-Kreis, Rhineland-Palatinate
 near Meerbusch;see above → near Ilverich
 near Mutterstadt;see below → near Roxheim
 near Neuhofen:Neuhofener Altrhein (Neuhöfer Altrhein) (l), between Altrip and Neuhofen, Rhein-Pfalz-Kreis, Rhineland-Palatinate
 near Neupotz;see above → near Leimersheim
 near Neureut;see above → near Karlsruhe
 near Nordheim;see above → near Lampertheim
 near Oberhausen;see below → near Philippsburg
 near Oggersheim;see below → near Roxheim
 near Ossenberg;see below → near Rheinberg
 near Ottenheim:Altrhein Lech (r), near Ottenheim, Ortenaukreis, Baden-Württemberg
 near Otterstadt:near Otterstadt, Rhein-Pfalz-Kreis, Rhineland-Palatinate (looking down the Rhine):
 Angelhofer Altrhein (l), near Otterstadt and in the Gebiet the kreisfreien Stadt Speyer;see also (below) → near Speyer
 Otterstädter Altrhein (l), near Otterstadt and Waldsee
 bei Philippsburg:Philippsburger Altrhein (r), near Philippsburg, county of Karlsruhe, Baden-Württemberg
 near Plittersdorf:near Plittersdorf (Rastatt), Rastatt, Baden-Württemberg (looking down the Rhine):
 Altrhein Plittersdorf (r)
 Altrheinarm (Plittersdorf) (r)
 Altrhein (Plittersdorf) (r)
 near Praest;see below → near Rees
 bei Rees:near Rees and Emmerich am Rhein, Kreis Kleve, North Rhine-Westphalia:
 Bienener Altrhein!--???Nr--> (r), near Esserden, Bienen, Praest and Dornick
 Grietherorter Altrhein (r), near Grietherort
 Reeser Altrhein (r), near Haffen and Rees
 near Rheinau;see below → near Diersheim: Steinwert-Hot 2 (Altrheinarm), below → near Freistett, below → near Helmlingen and above → near Honau
 near Rheinberg:Rheinberger Altrhein (Alter Rhein) (l), near Rheinberg and Ossenberg, Kreis Wesel, North Rhine-Westphalia
 near Rheinhausen;see above → near Philippsburg
 near Rheinsheim;see above → near Philippsburg
 near Riburg;see below → near Riburg (Rheinaltarm)
 bei Roxheim:Roxheimer Altrhein (//; l), from Mutterstadt inter alia through Ludwigshafen am Rhein to Roxheim, Rhein-Pfalz-Kreis, Rhineland-Palatinate:see also (below) → Silbersee
 Hinterer Roxheimer Altrhein (l), near Roxheim
 Vorderer Roxheimer Altrhein (l), near Roxheim
 near Rüdlingen;see below → near Rüdlingen (Rheinaltarm)
 near Rußheim:Rußheimer Altrhein (r), am Elisabethenwörth, with Alter Minthesee, near Rußheim (Dettenheim), Karlsruhe, Baden-Württemberg
 near Sasbach:Sasbacher Altrhein (r), near Sasbach am Kaiserstuhl, county of Emmendingen, Baden-Württemberg
 near Scherzheim:Altrhein (Scherzheim) (r), near Scherzheim (Lichtenau), county of Rastatt, Baden-Württemberg
 near Sondernheim:Michelsbach (Sondernheimer Altrhein) (l), near Sondernheim, county of Germersheim, Rhineland-Palatinate
 bei Speyer:Altlußheimer Altrhein (l), in the Speyerer Auwald, kreisfreie Stadt Speyer, Rhineland-Palatinate; gegenüber vom baden-württembergischen Altlußheim;see also (above) → near Otterstadt and below → Runkedebunk
 bei Steinmauern:see below → Goldkanal and see also (above) → near Elchesheim-Illingen
 bei Stockstadt/Erfelden:Stockstadt-Erfelder Altrhein (r), in the Kühkopf-Knoblochsaue nature reserve, near Stockstadt and Erfelden, Groß-Gerau, Hesse
 near Strümp;see above → near Ilverich
 near Tiengen;see below → near Tiengen (Rheinaltarm)
 bei Urdenbach:Urdenbacher Altrhein (r), near Baumberg (Monheim am Rhein) and Urdenbach, Kreis Mettmann and kreisfreie Stadt Düsseldorf, North Rhine-Westphalia
 near Waldsee;see above → near Otterstadt
 near Wintersdorf:Altrhein Wintersdorf (r), Rheinniederung Canal, near Wintersdorf, county of Rastatt, Baden-Württemberg
 bei Wörth am Rhein:Wörther Altrhein (l), near Wörth am Rhein, county of Germersheim, Rhineland-Palatinate;see also (above) → near Jockgrim
 bei Xanten:Xantener Altrhein (Alter Rhein) (l), near Birten and Xanten, Kreis Wesel, North Rhine-Westphalia

 Altrheinarm 
 Auer Altrheinarme(r), several old arms of the Rhine near Au am Rhein, county of Rastatt, Baden-Württemberg;see also (above) → near Au am Rhein
 Altrheinarm Kirchhöfel;see above → near Grauelsbaum
 Altrheinarm Plittersdorf;see above → near Plittersdorf
 Altrheinarm (Rheinbischofsheim) (r; with the Groschenwasser), near Rheinbischofsheim and Freistett (Rheinau), Ortenaukreis, Baden-Württemberg;see also (below) → near Freistett
 Altrheinarme Taubergießen(r), several old arms of the Rhine in the Auen- and NSG Taubergießen, inter alia near Rust, Ortenaukreis, Baden-Württemberg
 Steinwert-Hot 2 (Altrheinarm) (r), near Diersheim and Honau (Rheinau), Ortenaukreis, Baden-Württemberg

 Altrhein or Restrhein 

Section of the River Rhine called the Altrhein or Restrhein parallel to the 52.7-kilometre-long Grand Canal d'Alsace (Rheinseitenkanal), between the Stauwehr Märkt (Weil am Rhein; Lörrach, Baden-Württemberg; Germany) and Village-Neuf (department of Haut-Rhin; France) and the Kulturwehr Breisach (Breisgau-Hochschwarzwald, Baden-Württemberg; Germany) and Volgelsheim (department of Haut-Rhin; France) running as a border river;see also (above) → near Märkt

 Altrheinschlinge 
 Ilvericher Altrheinschlinge;see above → near Ilverich

 Altrheinzug 
 Altrheinzug (Grauelsbaum);see above → near Grauelsbaum
 Altrheinzug (Hügelsheim);see above → near Hügelsheim
 Durchgehender Altrheinzug (r), east along the Rhine, Baden-Württemberg

 Restrhein 
see above → Altrhein or Restrhein

 Rheinaltarm 
see also (above) → Altarm
 near Giriz:Rheinaltarm Giriz (l), near Koblenz AG, canton of Aargau, Switzerland
 bei Riburg:Rheinaltarm Riburg (l), near Riburg (Möhlin), canton of Aargau, Switzerland
 bei Rüdlingen:Rheinaltarm Rüdlingen (l), near Rüdlingen, canton of Schaffhausen, Switzerland
 bei Tiengen:Rheinaltarm Tiengen (r), near Tiengen (Waldshut-Tiengen), county of Waldshut, Baden-Württemberg

 Special old Rhine waterbodies 
Waterbodies that are not called e.g. Alter Rhein or Altrhein, but are nevertheless old arms of the Rhine are:
 Die Roos (l), old arm of the Rhine near Friemersheim and Hohenbudberg, by and in the nature reserve of Rheinaue Friemersheim, in the boroughs of Duisburg and Krefeld, North Rhine-Westphalia
  near Freistett;near Freistett (Rheinau), Ortenaukreis, Baden-Württemberg (looking down the Rhine):see also (above) → Altrheinarm (Rheinbischofsheim)
 Bischemer Grund (r)
 Altwasser am Dreimärkerweg (r)
 Altwasser am Kreuzdammweg (r)
 Altwasser im Steingrund (r)
 bei Helmlingen:near Helmlingen (Rheinau), Ortenaukreis, Baden-Württemberg (looking down the Rhine):
 Hellwasser (r), near Helmlingen and Freistett
 Herrenwasser (r)
 Mittelkopf (r)
 Rubenkopfkehle (r)
 Judenloch (r)
 Niep (Niepkuhlenzug)'' and angrenzende Kuhlen (l), between the city of Krefeld and Issum in the county of Wesel, North Rhine-Westphalia
 Rheinlöcher/Scheidegraben (l), near Ibersheim and Hamm am Rhein, near Ibersheimer Wörth, in the borough of Worms and municipality of Hamm am Rhein, Alzey-Worms, Rhineland Palatinate
 Runkedebunk (l), in the Speyerer Auwald, Speyer, Rhineland-Palatinate; near Berghäuser Altrhein and opposite the island of Horn;see also (above) → near Speyer

Waterbodies linked to the Rhine 
These are artificially created waterbodies alongside the Rhine (such as quarry ponds), which are neither old arms nor tributaries of the Rhine, but which could be confused with such and are directly or indirectly linked to the Rhine. (sorted alphabetically by name):
 Altrheinsee (l), near Eich, county of Alzey-Worms, Rhineland-Palatinate(quarry pond, with very large part of the Gimbsheimer Altrhein)
 Eicher See (l), near Eich and Hamm am Rhein, county of Alzey-Worms, Rhineland-Palatinate(quarry pond with marina including link to the Rhine; formed end of the 20th century)see also (above) → near Gimbsheim
 Goldkanal (r), near Steinmauern and Illingen (Elchesheim-Illingen), county of Rastatt, Baden-Württemberg;(old arm of the Rhine massively expanded as a quarry pond)see also (above) → near Elchesheim-Illingen
 Knielinger See (r), near Knielingen and Maxau, in the NSG Altrhein Maxau, in borough of Karlsruhe, Baden-Württemberg(quarry pond with small section of old Rhine arm and dredged old Rhine waterbodies)see also (above) → near Karlsruhe
 Silbersee (l), near Roxheim, Rhein-Pfalz-Kreis, Rhineland-Palatinate(quarry pond on the inside of the bend of the Vorderen and Hinteren Roxheimer Altrhein)see also (above) → near Roxheim

See also 
 Oude Rijn (Gelderland)
 Oude Rijn (Utrecht and South Holland)

External links 

!Altrhein

Old Rhine